Pohjosen poika is the second studio album by Finnish rapper Mikael Gabriel. It was released on 26 January 2011. The album peaked at number nine on the Official Finnish Album Chart.

Track listing

Charts

Release history

References

2011 albums
Mikael Gabriel albums